Neoblastobasis perisella is a moth in the  family Blastobasidae. It is found in Kenya and the Democratic Republic of the Congo, where it is known from coastal lowland habitats.

The length of the forewings is 5.1–5.5 mm. The forewings are pale brown from the base to near the midcell, except for some brown scales along the costa. Brown scales and pale brown scales tipped with brown intermixed with fewer pale brown scales are found from the midcell to the outer margin. The hindwings are pale greyish brown.

The larvae feed on Hugonia castaneifolia and Ximenia caffra.

Etymology
The species is named in honour of Peris Machera, a worker in the insect-rearing laboratory in Nairobi, Kenya.

References

Moths described in 2010
Blastobasidae
Moths of Africa